Wynne is a surname Welsh origin

Wynne may also refer to:
Wynne (given name)
 Wynne Prize, an Australian art prize
Wynne, Arkansas, a city in the USA
Wynne High School, Arkansas
Wyne (tribe), Pakistani clan, also spelled Wynne
Wynee, the first Native Hawaiian from the Hawaiian Islands to traveled abroad

See also
Wynn (disambiguation)
Wyne (disambiguation)